Liverpool James Street railway station (commonly shortened to James Street station) is a railway station located in the centre of Liverpool, England, situated on the Wirral Line of the Merseyrail network. James Street is an underground station with access to the platforms via lifts from the James Street booking hall. At certain times the platforms are accessed via a pedestrian tunnel from the India Buildings on Water Street. As of 2013/14, James Street was the fifth-busiest station on the Merseyrail network.

History 

The station opened as the original Liverpool terminus of the Mersey Railway Tunnel in 1886. James Street Station and Hamilton Square underground station in Birkenhead are the oldest deep-level underground stations in the world. The only other underground railway in 1886, London Underground, had stations just below the street surface, built using the cut-and-cover method. The stations are so deep they required lifts to access, and were the world's first lift-accessed stations. The lifts were initially hydraulically operated. There were originally two platforms, either side of a twin-track tunnel.

The Mersey railway tunnel was extended under dry land to Liverpool Central station in 1892, changing James Street's status to a through station. By this time, there were trains from Liverpool branching from Hamilton Square station terminating at Birkenhead Park and Rock Ferry stations in Birkenhead. The line was electrified in 1903. Through trains to West Kirby and New Brighton commenced in 1938, when the former Wirral Railway routes were electrified.

In 1941, during the Liverpool Blitz, the Luftwaffe bombed the surface building of the station, damaging the then famous James Street hydraulic accumulator tower so badly it required demolition. A new surface building was built in the 1960s.

The station was rebuilt in the 1970s, opening in 1977, as a creation of the Merseyrail network. A new single-track tunnel known as the Loop was constructed being a part of the Wirral Line under Liverpool's city centre. The Loop ran west from the Mersey Railway tunnel via a newly constructed third platform at James Street, then onto Moorfields, Liverpool Lime Street and Liverpool Central, and back to James Street rejoining the Mersey railway tunnel just to the east of the station.

The eastern section of the original tunnel between Liverpool Central and James Street is used by the Northern Line. Of the original two platforms at James Street, only the westbound remains in regular use. Platform 2, the original eastbound platform, is kept in near-original condition, being used only when trains are prevented from using the loop itself.

The station and surrounding area were subject to a £2million package of improvements during 2007–8. Further refurbishment of platforms, concourses and the booking hall were undertaken in 2012–13, as part of a £40 million investment from Network Rail which saw all Merseyrail underground stations (excluding ) refurbished. Work to improve the little-used Platform 2 and the Water Street entrance were completed during 2015.

Station layout

James Street station has three platforms, although only two see regular use. Platforms 2 and 3 are situated on either side of the original Mersey Railway tunnel, and platform 1 in the newer tunnel on the loop line. Only platforms 1 and 3 are in regular use for the loop line, Platform 3 by trains westbound to the Wirral and Platform 1 by trains eastbound towards Liverpool. Platform 2, which is situated on the empty stock line opposite platform 3, has not normally been used by passenger services since the opening of the loop line. This platform has a frieze artwork, on the wall.

The junction at the western end of the station (where the loop leaves the original line in order to pass through platform 1) is known as Mann Island Junction.

Occasionally, the loop line may close to allow for maintenance to occur. 
On these occasions, platform 2 is brought back into use to allow trains arriving from the Wirral to terminate and reverse there back onto the westbound line (either directly or via platform 3).

There are two entrances to the station. The main entrance on James Street itself has four lifts to reach the platforms from street level. It also has a small newsagents inside. The Water Street entrance uses a combination of staircases and a ramp over 150 yards long which goes from ground level to just above the platforms. The Water Street entrance is only in use during certain times of the day and is closed at weekends. It is open between 7am and 10am, then again from 3pm to 6pm.

Facilities
The station is staffed, during all opening hours, and has platform CCTV. There are toilets, a payphone, an ATM, booking office and live departure and arrival screens, for passenger information. The station does not have a car park, though there is a cycle rack for eight bicycles. Step-free access to the platforms, for wheelchairs and prams, is possible, via the lifts.

Services
Trains operate every five minutes (Monday-Saturday daytime) around the Liverpool city centre loop to Moorfields, Liverpool Lime Street and Liverpool Central.  In the other direction, trains operate every five minutes to Hamilton Square, from where they continue every 15 minutes to each of New Brighton and West Kirby with six trains an hour to Hooton.  From Hooton, trains continue every 15 minutes to Chester and every 30 minutes to Ellesmere Port.  At other times, trains operate every 30 minutes to each of the four destinations, giving a service every 5–10 minutes to Hamilton Square. These services are all provided by Merseyrail's fleet of Class 507 and Class 508 EMUs.

See also
List of underground stations of the Merseyrail network

References

Sources

External links

 
 

James Street
DfT Category E stations
Railway stations in Liverpool
Former Mersey Railway stations
Railway stations in Great Britain opened in 1886
Railway stations served by Merseyrail
Railway stations located underground in the United Kingdom